The 2009 AMA Pro American Superbike Championship was the 34th running of the AMA Superbike Championship, an American motorcycle racing championship.  Mat Mladin won his seventh championship and announced his retirement following the season.

Calendar and results

Championship standings

Entry list

All entries utilize Dunlop tyres.

See also
2009 AMA Pro Daytona Sportbike Championship season

References

AMA Superbike Championship seasons
Ama
Ama pro